Mene oblonga is a species of ray-finned fish that first appeared in the Monte Bolca Lagerstatten during the Lutetian epoch of the Eocene.  For a menid, it has a very shallow body, especially in comparison with the sympatric Mene rhombea.  Its fossils are very rare in Monte Bolca.  A single fossil from the early Oligocene, referred to as "Mene oblonga var. pusilla," was found in Chiavon, Italy.

References
"A new species of Mene (Perciformes: Menidae) from the Paleocene of South America, with notes on paleoenvironment and a brief review of menid fishes."

Menidae
Eocene fish
Oligocene fish
Rupelian species extinctions
Prehistoric life of Europe